Thomas M. Dougherty (2 February 1910 – 5 September 1996) was an American politician.

Dougherty was born on an Eddyville, Iowa, farm on 2 February 1910, to parents John H. and Jennie Dougherty. He graduated from St. Patrick's High School in unincorporated Georgetown in 1928 and continued working on the family farm. Dougherty was a member of several agricultural associations. He was seated to the Iowa House of Representatives on 18 February 1964, as a Democratic legislator representing District 17. Dougherty subsequently won two full terms for District 16, and served his third and final full term representing District 94. Dougherty died on 5 September 1996 in Albia.

References

1910 births
1996 deaths
Farmers from Iowa
People from Eddyville, Iowa
20th-century American politicians
Democratic Party members of the Iowa House of Representatives